Trena is a given name. Notable people with the name include:

 Trena Cox (1895–1980), English artist
 Trena King (born 1958), American archer
 Trena Trice-Hill (born 1965), American basketball player

See also
 Trina (name)

Macedonian given names